The West Branch of the Dead Diamond River is a  river in northern New Hampshire in the United States. It is a tributary of the Dead Diamond River, located in the Androscoggin River watershed of Maine and New Hampshire.

The West Branch of the Dead Diamond River rises in a southern corner of the town of Pittsburg, New Hampshire, at the juncture of Rowell and Roby brooks. Flowing southeast, it passes into the township of Atkinson and Gilmanton Academy Grant, where it joins the East Branch to form the Dead Diamond River. The Middle Branch of the Dead Diamond joins the West Branch shortly before the West and East branches join.

See also

List of rivers of New Hampshire

References

Rivers of New Hampshire
Rivers of Coös County, New Hampshire